"", officially translated as "Patriotic Song", is the national anthem of the Democratic People's Republic of Korea, more commonly known as North Korea. It was composed in 1945 as a patriotic song celebrating independence from Japanese occupation and was adopted as the state anthem in 1947.

Etymology
"Aegukka" is a Romanized transliteration of "The Patriotic Song"; the song is also known by its incipit Ach'imŭn pinnara or "Let Morning Shine" or in its Korean name  or alternatively as the "Song of a Devotion to a Country".

The Encyclopedia of Korean Culture defines "Aegukka" as "the song to wake up the mind to love the country". "Aegukka" in itself is differentiated from a national anthem. While a national anthem or gukka is an official symbol of the state, aegukka refers to any song, official or unofficial, that contains patriotic fervor towards its country, such as Hungary's "Szózat" or the U.S. "The Stars and Stripes Forever". However, the nationally designated "Aegukka" plays the role of symbolizing the country. In general shorthand, the term aegukka refers to the national anthem of North Korea.

History 

Originally, the Korean exile government (1919–1945) in Shanghai, China adopted as their national anthem "Aegukga" (which has the same name with a different Romanization) to the tune of "Auld Lang Syne". After World War II, South Korea kept the words, put to a new tune (changed from "Auld Lang Syne"), while North Korea adopted this newly written piece in 1947. The words were written by Pak Se-yong and the music was composed by Kim Won-gyun.

In the early 1980s, Kim Jong-il sought to reduce the song's importance to the benefit of "Song of General Kim Il-sung".

The complete version of "Aegukka" consists two verses. On official occasions, when only the first verse is performed, it is customary to repeat the last four bars. However, if both verses are performed, it is the last four bars of the second verse that are repeated instead. "Song of General Kim Il-sung" and "Song of General Kim Jong-il" have since taken the place of de facto national anthems domestically, and "Aegukka" is reserved for representing North Korea internationally: when foreign dignitaries visit the country or North Korean athletes compete at international sporting competitions. "Aegukka" is almost unique among most North Korean patriotic songs, as it praises neither the Workers' Party of Korea, nor the Kim dynasty, but rather the whole of Korea itself. "Aegukka" is played at the start of each of Korean Central Television's broadcast days.

Lyrics

See also

 National symbols of North Korea

Notes

References

Further reading

External links

Lyrics in English at Naenara
Lyrics in Korean at Naenara
Lyrics in English at Kim Il-Sung University
"Aegukka" (mp3) at Naenara

North Korean songs
Asian anthems
National symbols of North Korea
National anthem compositions in B-flat major
National anthem compositions in C major
National anthem compositions in D major